Shuangjiang, may refer to:

 Shuangjiang (solar term), 18th solar term in traditional East Asian calendars

 Shuangjiang Lahu, Va, Blang and Dai Autonomous County, in Yunnan, China

Towns in China
Shuangjiang, the name of several towns in China:

 Shuangjiang, Tongdao (双江镇), a town and the seat of Tongdao County, Hunan.

 Shuangjiang, Loudi (双江乡),  a township of Louxing District, Loudi City, Hunan.

 Shuangjiang, Changsha, a former town of Changsha County, merged to Jinjing Town on November 19, 2015.